The Donovan hemi is an American Top Fuel drag racing engine, designed and built by Ed Donovan and first appearing in 1971. In the 1970s, it was the most popular engine in Top Fuel dragsters.

History 
Donovan developed the  hemi-head V8 to overcome the tendency of  Chryslers, then used by Top Fuel racers (many of them friends and customers of his), to crack their iron blocks.

Donovan milled all the internal oil and water passages, and (unlike the stock 392) sleeved the block with chrome-moly cylinder liners, which were stronger as well as easy to replace. Donovan also enlarged the supports for the main bearings, which Chrysler would do with the B-block.

Donovan completed work on the engine in 1970, and first sold it in 1971; the first driver to use a Donovan hemi was "Kansas John" Wiebe, at the 1971 NHRA Super Nationals, where Wiebe very nearly won Top Fuel. By 1972, it was commonplace in Top Fuel dragsters, and Altereds would also use it.

References

External links 
Donovan Engines website
Jalopy Journal discussion of the Donovan

V8 engines
Drag racing